The 2013 Open Championship was a men's major golf championship and the 142nd Open Championship, held from 18–21 July at Muirfield Golf Links in Gullane, East Lothian, Scotland. Phil Mickelson shot a final round 66 (−5) to win his fifth major title, three strokes ahead of runner-up Henrik Stenson. Mickelson began the round five strokes back, in a tie for ninth place.  Ian Poulter, Adam Scott, and 54-hole leader Lee Westwood tied for third, four back of Mickelson.

Venue

The 2013 event was the 16th Open Championship played at Muirfield. The most recent was in 2002, when Ernie Els won his third major championship in a playoff over Stuart Appleby, Steve Elkington, and ultimately in a sudden-death playoff over Thomas Levet. Nick Faldo won the previous Open at the venue, in 1992; the first was in 1892.

The course was extended  since 2002.

Course layout

Lengths of the course for Opens since 1950:

 2013: , par 71
 2002: , par 71
 1992: , par 71
 1987: , par 71

 1980: , par 71
 1972: , par 71
 1966: , par 71
 1959: , par 72

Field
Each player is classified according to the first category in which he qualified, but other categories are shown in parentheses.

1. The Open Champions aged 60 or under on 21 July 2013
Mark Calcavecchia (3,4), Stewart Cink (2,3), Darren Clarke (2,3), Ben Curtis (2,3), David Duval, Ernie Els (2,3,4,5,14), Nick Faldo, Todd Hamilton (2), Pádraig Harrington (2,3,12), Paul Lawrie (5,6,17), Tom Lehman, Justin Leonard (3), Sandy Lyle, Mark O'Meara, Louis Oosthuizen (2,3,5,6,14), Tiger Woods (2,3,4,5,13,14,17)

 John Daly withdrew with an elbow injury.
 Eligible but did not compete: Ian Baker-Finch, Greg Norman (3), Nick Price.

2. The Open Champions for 2003–2012

3. The Open Champions finishing in the first 10 and tying for 10th place in The Open Championship 2008–2012
Tom Watson

4. First 10 and anyone tying for 10th place in the 2012 Open Championship at Royal Lytham & St Annes
Thomas Aiken, Nicolas Colsaerts (5,6,17), Luke Donald (5,6,7,14,17), Miguel Ángel Jiménez (6), Dustin Johnson (5,14,17), Zach Johnson (5,14,17), Matt Kuchar (5,13,14,17), Graeme McDowell (5,6,10,17), Alex Norén (6), Geoff Ogilvy, Thorbjørn Olesen (5,6), Ian Poulter (5,6,17), Adam Scott (5,11,14), Vijay Singh, Brandt Snedeker (5,14,17)

5. The first 50 players on the Official World Golf Ranking for Week 21, 2013
Keegan Bradley (12,14,17), Tim Clark, Jason Day, Jamie Donaldson (6), Jason Dufner (14,17), Gonzalo Fernández-Castaño (6), Rickie Fowler (14), Jim Furyk (14,17), Sergio García (14,17), Robert Garrigus (14), Branden Grace (6,20), Bill Haas, Peter Hanson (6,17), Thongchai Jaidee (6), Martin Kaymer (6,12,17), David Lynn (6), Hunter Mahan (14), Matteo Manassero (6,7), Rory McIlroy (6,10,12,14,17), Phil Mickelson (9,11,14,17), Francesco Molinari (6,17), Ryan Moore (14), Carl Pettersson (14), Scott Piercy (14), D. A. Points, Justin Rose (6,10,14,17), Charl Schwartzel (6,11), Webb Simpson (10,14,17), Henrik Stenson, Kevin Streelman, Michael Thompson, Bo Van Pelt (14), Nick Watney (14), Bubba Watson (11,14,17), Lee Westwood (6,14,17)

Steve Stricker (14,17) did not enter.

6. First 30 in the Race to Dubai for 2012
Rafa Cabrera-Bello, George Coetzee, Marcus Fraser, Shane Lowry, Richie Ramsay, Marcel Siem, Bernd Wiesberger, Danny Willett

7. The BMW PGA Championship winners for 2011–2013

8. First 5 European Tour members and any European Tour members tying for 5th place, not otherwise exempt, in the top 20 of the Race to Dubai on completion of the 2013 Alstom Open de France
Thomas Bjørn, Mikko Ilonen, Brett Rumford, Richard Sterne, Marc Warren

9. The Scottish Open Champion for 2013

10. The U.S. Open Champions for 2009–2013
Lucas Glover

11. The Masters Tournament Champions for 2009–2013
Ángel Cabrera

12. The PGA Champions for 2008–2012
Yang Yong-eun

13. The Players Champions for 2011–2013
K. J. Choi

14. The leading 30 qualifiers for the 2012 Tour Championship
John Huh, John Senden15. First 5 PGA Tour members and any PGA Tour members tying for 5th place, not exempt in the top 20 of the PGA Tour FedEx Cup points list for 2013 on completion of the 2013 The Greenbrier ClassicHarris English, Russell Henley, Billy Horschel, Jimmy Walker, Boo Weekley16. The John Deere Classic winner for 2013Jordan Spieth17. Playing members of the 2012 Ryder Cup teams18. First and anyone tying for 1st place on the Order of Merit of the Asian Tour for 2012Thaworn Wiratchant19. First and anyone tying for 1st place on the Order of Merit of the Tour of Australasia for 2012Peter Senior20. First and anyone tying for 1st place on the Order of Merit of the Southern Africa PGA Sunshine Tour for 201221. The Japan Open Champion for 2012Kenichi Kuboya22. First 2 and anyone tying for 2nd place, not exempt, on the Official Money List of the Japan Golf Tour for 2012Hiroyuki Fujita, Toru Taniguchi23. The leading 4 players, not exempt, in the 2013 Mizuno OpenMakoto Inoue, Brendan Jones, Shingo Katayama, Kim Kyung-tae24. First 2 and anyone tying for 2nd place, in a cumulative money list taken from all official 2013 Japan Golf Tour events up to and including the 2013 Mizuno Open.Kim Hyung-sung, Satoshi Kodaira25. The Senior Open Champion for 2012Fred Couples26. The Amateur Champion for 2013Garrick Porteous (a)27. The U.S. Amateur Champion for 2012Steven Fox (a)28. The European Amateur Champion for 2012Rhys Pugh (a)29. The Mark H. McCormack Medal winner for 2012Chris Williams lost his exemption by turning professional after the U.S. Open.International Final QualifyingAustralasia: Mark Brown, Stephen Dartnall, Steven JeffressAsia: Kiradech Aphibarnrat, Daisuke Maruyama, Hideki Matsuyama, Wu AshunAfrica: Eduardo de la Riva, Justin Harding, Darryn LloydAmerica: Scott Brown, Bud Cauley, Brian Davis, Luke Guthrie, Robert Karlsson, Josh Teater, Camilo Villegas, Johnson WagnerEurope: Grégory Bourdy, Niclas Fasth, Oliver Fisher, Estanislao Goya, Scott Jamieson, Brooks Koepka, Gareth Maybin, Richard McEvoy, Álvaro QuirósLocal Final QualifyingDunbar: Grant Forrest (a), Shiv Kapur, John WadeGullane No 1: Matt Fitzpatrick (a), Oscar Florén, Ben Stow (a)North Berwick: Jimmy Mullen (a), George Murray, Gareth WrightThe Musselburgh: Tyrrell Hatton, Lloyd Saltman, Steven Tiley

 (a) denotes amateurAlternates' 
To make up the full entry of 156, additional players were drawn from the Official World Golf Ranking dated 7 July 2013 (provided the player was entered in the Open and did not withdraw from qualifying).

 Jonas Blixt (ranked 51)
 Martin Laird (59)
 Freddie Jacobson (63)
 Marc Leishman (66)
 Graham DeLaet (67)
 Kyle Stanley (68)
 Chris Wood (70)
 Ken Duke (73)
 Stephen Gallacher (75) replaced John Daly
 Scott Stallings (76) took spot reserved for Scottish Open champion

Round summaries

First roundThursday, 18 July 2013Zach Johnson was the first round leader after shooting a 5-under-par 66. Both Johnson and Indian outsider Shiv Kapur reached 6-under during their rounds before dropping shots on the tougher back nine, Kapur doing so during difficult afternoon conditions by birdieing six of his first seven holes. Two Spaniards, 49-year-old Miguel Ángel Jiménez and Rafa Cabrera-Bello, had also reached 5-under before late bogeys, as had veteran Mark O'Meara. Two seniors were in the top five: O'Meara (56 years old), the 1998 champion, was tied for second at 67 and Tom Lehman (54), the 1996 champion, was tied for fourth at 68. Defending champion Ernie Els shot 74 (+3), tarnished by a triple-bogey after bunker trouble at the 16th. World number one Tiger Woods, playing in the tough later conditions, opened with a bogey after snap-hooking his tee shot and taking an unplayable lie, but fought his way back to 69 (−2) in pursuit of his 15th major championship. Out-of-form world number two Rory McIlroy, however, struggled to a 79 (+8) despite an early tee time. Phil Mickelson, four-time major champion and the winner of the previous week's Scottish Open, also had a 69 despite a closing bogey.

Second roundFriday, 19 July 2013At the end of the second round, nine players were under par, and the cut line was +8. Jiménez was the leader at 139 (−3). Dustin Johnson, Henrik Stenson, Lee Westwood, and Woods were all one shot behind at 140.

Amateurs: Fitzpatrick (+7), Mullen (+7), Porteous (+11), Stow (+11), Fox (+15), Forrest (+17), Pugh (+19).

Third roundSaturday, 20 July 2013Westwood's 70 (−1) took the 54-hole lead at 210 (−3), which included a long eagle at the 5th hole. Hunter Mahan shot 68 (−3) to move into a tie for second at 212 (−1). Woods held sole possession of the lead early in the round, but carded 72 (+1) to fall back to 212 with Mahan. Adam Scott shot 70 (−1) to move to even-par 213.

Final roundSunday, 21 July 2013Through the first six holes, 54-hole leader Westwood was even for the day, but then faltered down the stretch. After a bogey on the 8th, Westwood relinquished the lead to Scott, who birdied the 11th to go two-under for the championship. Westwood bogeyed three more holes to finish at +1. "I didn't play badly, but I didn't play great", he remarked.

Mickelson, who started the round five shots back, carded a 34 (−2) on the front nine to get to even-par for the championship. After bogeying the 10th, he got back to even par with a birdie at the 13th, then birdied the 14th while Scott bogeyed the 13th and the two were tied for the lead at −1. After two pars, Mickelson birdied the final two holes to finish at 281 (−3). At that point, about an hour of play remained but Mickelson knew he had all but won the event. Scott followed up his bogey on the 13th with bogeys on each of the next three holes.

Stenson shot 70 (−1) and finished three strokes back of Mickelson in second place at even-par 284. Ian Poulter got hot in the middle of his round and posted a 67 (−4) to tie for third with Scott and Westwood. Woods started the day two strokes off the lead, but shot a 74 (+3) to tie for sixth. Mahan, who also started the day two strokes back, carded a 75 (+4) and tied for ninth.

Mickelson attained his fifth major title and first Open Championship. He had previously struggled at the event, recording just two finishes in the top-10 in 19 tries. Mickelson's caddy, Jim "Bones" Mackay, called the final round "the best round of his career." Mickelson agreed, saying "I don't care how I got it, [the Claret Jug trophy] ...it just so happened to be with one of the best rounds of my career ... I've always tried to go out and get it ... And today I did."

Source:

Amateurs: Fitzpatrick (+10), Mullen (+15).

ScorecardFinal roundCumulative tournament scores, relative to par''

Source:

Notes and references

External links
Muirfield 2013 (Official site)
142nd Open Championship - Muirfield (European Tour)
2013 Open Championship (PGA of America)

The Open Championship
Golf tournaments in Scotland
Open Championship
Open Championship
Open Championship